The Italian Navy (abbreviated as MM) is the navy of the Italian Republic. It is one of the four branches of Italian Armed Forces and was formed in 1946 from what remained of the Regia Marina (Royal Navy) after World War II. , the Italian Navy had a strength of 30,923 active personnel, with approximately 184 vessels in service, including minor auxiliary vessels. It is considered a multiregional and a blue-water navy.

History

Before and during World War II

The Regia Marina was formed on 17 March 1861, after the proclamation of the Kingdom of Italy. The Italian Navy assumed its present name after the Italian monarchy was abolished following a popular referendum held on 2 June 1946.

After World War II

At the end of its five years involvement in World War II, Italy was a devastated nation. After the end of hostilities, the Regia Marina – which at the beginning of the war was the fourth largest navy in the world, with a mix of modernised and new battleships – started a long and complex rebuilding process. The important combat contributions of the Italian naval forces after the signing of the armistice with the Allies on 8 September 1943, and the subsequent cooperation agreement on 23 September 1943, left the Regia Marina in a poor condition, with much of its infrastructure and bases unusable and its ports mined and blocked by sunken ships. However, a large number of its naval units had survived the war, albeit in a low efficiency state, which was due to the conflict and the age of many vessels. The vessels that remained were:
 5 battleships
 10 cruisers
 10 destroyers
 20 frigates
 20 corvettes
 50 fast coastal patrol units
 50 minesweepers
 19 amphibious operations vessels
 5 school ships
 1 support ship and plane transport

The peace treaty

The peace treaty signed on 10 February 1947 in Paris was onerous for Regia Marina. Apart from territorial and material losses, also the following restrictions were imposed:
 A ban on owning, building or experimenting with atomic weapons, self-propulsion projectiles or relative launchers, etc.
 A ban on owning battleships, aircraft carriers, submarines and amphibious assault units.
 A ban on operating military installations on the islands of Pantelleria, Pianosa and on the archipelago of the Pelagie Islands.

The treaty also ordered Italy to put the following ships at the disposals of the victorious nations United States, Soviet Union, Great Britain, France, Greece, Yugoslavia and Albania as war compensation:
 3 battleships: Giulio Cesare, Italia, Vittorio Veneto;
 5 cruisers: Emanuele Filiberto Duca d'Aosta, Attilio Regolo, Scipione Africano, Eugenio di Savoia and Eritrea;
 6 minesweepers: like Aliseo and Fortunale;
 8 submarines: 3 of the Acciaio class;
 1 sailing school ship: Cristoforo Colombo.

The entry into NATO

Great changes in the international political situation, which were developing into the Cold War, convinced the United Kingdom and United States to discontinue the transfer of Italy's capital ships as war reparations. Some had already been dismantled in La Spezia between 1948 and 1955, including the aircraft carrier . However, the Soviet Union demanded the surrender of the battleship Giulio Cesare and other naval units designated for transfer. The cruisers Attilio Regolo and Scipione Africano became the French Chateaurenault and Guichen, while  became the Greek Elli. After break up and/or transfers, only a small part of the fleet remained to be recommissioned into the Marina. As Western attention turned to the Soviets and the Mediterranean Sea, Italian seas became one of the main sites of confrontation between the two superpowers, contributing to the re-emergence of Italy's naval importance thanks to her strategic geographical position.

With the new elections in 1946, the Kingdom of Italy became a republic, and the Regia Marina took the name of Marina Militare. As the Marshall Plan began to rebuild Italy and Europe was rapidly being divided into two geopolitically antagonistic blocs, Italy began talks with the United States to guarantee adequate security considerations. The US government in Washington wished to keep its own installations on the Italian Peninsula and relaxed the Treaty restrictions by including Italy in the Mutual Defense Assistance Programme (MDAP). On 4 April 1949, Italy joined the North Atlantic Treaty Organization (NATO) and, in order for the navy to contribute actively in the organization, the Treaty restrictions were definitively repealed by the end of 1951, with the consent of all of Western nations.

Within NATO, the Italian Navy was assigned combat control of the Adriatic Sea and Strait of Otranto, as well as the defence of the naval routes through the Tyrrhenian Sea.

Naval ensign

The ensign of the Italian Navy is the flag of Italy bearing the coat of arms of the Italian Navy. The shield's quarters refer to the four Medieval Italian Maritime Republics:

 1st quarter: on red, a golden winged lion (the lion of St. Mark) wielding a sword (Republic of Venice)
 2nd quarter: on white field, red cross (Republic of Genoa)
 3rd quarter: on blue field, white Maltese cross (Republic of Amalfi)
 4th quarter: on red field, white Pisan cross (Republic of Pisa)

The coat of arms is surmounted by a golden crown, which distinguishes military vessels from those of the merchant navy.

The crown, was proposed in 1939 as a conjectural link to the Roman navy by Admiral Domenico Cavagnari, then a member of the Chamber of Fasces and Corporations in the Fascist government.

A further difference is that St. Mark's lion, symbolising the Republic of Venice, does not hold the gospel in its paw (as it does on the civil ensign, where the book is open at the words "", meaning "peace to you, Mark, my evangelist") and is wielding a sword instead: such an image is consistent with the pictorial tradition from Venetian history, in which the book is shown open during peacetime and closed during wartime.

Structure and organisation

Organization

In 2012 the Navy began a restructuring process that will see a 21% decrease in personnel by 2025. A new structure was implemented in January 2014.

Coast Guard
The Corps of the Port Captaincies – Coast Guard is the coast guard of Italy and is part of the Italian Navy under the control of the Ministry of Infrastructures and Transports, the Ministry of the Environment, the Ministry of Agricultural, Food and Forestry Policies, as well as, obviously, the Ministry of Defence. In Italy, it is commonly known as simply the Guardia costiera or Capitaneria di Porto. The Coast Guard has approximately 11 000 staff.

Corps
The Italian Navy is divided into six corps (by precedence):

  – Staff Officers Corps (SM): line officers
  – Naval Engineers Corps (GM)
  – Marine engineering branch (GM/GN): engineer officers
  – Naval ordnance branch (GM/AN): weapon engineer officers
  – Infrastructure engineering (GM/INFR): civil engineer officers
  – Maritime Military Medical Corps: (MD) for medics, (FM) for pharmacists
  – Military Maritime Supply Corps (CM): administration, paymaster, legal executive, supply, logistics officer
  – Port Captaincies Corps (CP): the coast guard
  – Military Maritime Crews Corps (CEMM)

Fleet
Command of the Italian Fleet (ships, submarines and amphibious forces) and Naval aviation falls under the Commander in Chief Naval Fleet.

Equipment

Ships and submarines

Today's Italian Navy is a modern navy with ships of every type. The fleet is in continuous evolution, and as of today oceangoing fleet units include: 2 light aircraft carriers, 3 amphibious assault ships, 4 destroyers, 11 frigates and 8 attack submarines. Patrol and littoral warfare units include: 10 offshore patrol vessels, 10 mine countermeasure vessels, 4 coastal patrol boats, and a varied fleet of auxiliary ships are also in service.

The flagship of the fleet is the carrier Cavour.

Aircraft

The Italian Navy operates a diverse fleet of aircraft including fixed-wing, rotary and UAVs.

Future
  2 x Bergamini-class general purpose (Enhanced, with ASW capabilities) frigates, being built to replace two vessels from the Italian FREMM-class build program that were transferred to Egypt in 2020 and 2021; delivery is anticipated in the 2025–26 period.

The 2014 Naval Act allocated Euro 5.4 billion for the following vessels:
 1 x Trieste landing helicopter dock (L9890), for commissioning in 2023 (with 4 landing craft Vittoria LC23  and 2 combat boat Baglietto MNI15) to replace CVL Giuseppe Garibaldi (551)
  7 x Thaon di Revel-class Offshore patrol vessel/frigate, for commissioning between 2021 and 2026, with three more on option

The 2017 budget allocated 12.8 billion (2017–2032 years) for the following ships:
  1 x Special & Diving Operations – Submarine Rescue Ship (SOD – SuRS), to replace the submarine rescue ship Anteo (A 5309)
 1 x Major Hydro-oceanographic Ship (NIOM), to replace the hydrographic survey vessel Ammiraglio Magnaghi (A5303)
 12 x minehunters to replace the Lerici and Gaeta-class minehunters:
 8 x Cacciamine Nuova Generazione-Costieri (CNG-C, New Generation Minehunter – Coastal) for homeland security roles (about 800 t and 57 m)
 4 x Cacciamine Nuova Generazione-Altura (CNG-A, New Generation Minehunter – Ocean-going) for expeditionary roles (about 1,300 t and 75–80 m)
 8 x European Patrol Corvettes in a joint program with France (about 3,200 t)

The 2018 budget allocated about 1 Billion Euros for:
 2 x U212NFS attack submarines, for commissioning in 2027–2029. In December 2022, an amended contract was signed for production of a third NFS Submarine based on the design of the previous two submarines. The third Submarine (NFS 3) is planned to be delivered at the end of 2030, while a contract for the fourth boat is anticipated in 2023.

The "Documento Programmatico Pluriennale 2021–2023" funds the following ships:
 2 x 11,000-ton DDX-class destroyers, a development of the Horizon-class to replace the Durand de la Penne-class guided missile destroyers by 2028 to 2030
 3 x Vulcano-class logistic support ships, to replace Vesuvio (A5329) and Etna (A 5326)
 1 x UBOS, diving support vessel
 10 x MTC, coastal transport vessels to replace the Gorgona-class and Ponza-class
 4 x training vessels
 MLU Mid-Life Update of the Horizon-class destroyers

Planned
 3 x amphibious transport docks, to replace the San Giorgio-class amphibious transport docks (about 18,000 t)
 1 x electronic surveillance ship to add to the existing Elettra (A 5340)
 1 x submarine and minehunter support ship

For the Naval Aviation the Navy plans to expand for replace the following assets:
 9 x maritime patrol aircraft (currently 4 x ATR 72MP in service)
 30 x heavy helicopters (currently 22 x AW101 in service) 
 12 x light utility helicopters, a new acquisition of AW169 helicopters
 16 x tactical unmanned aerial vehicles (currently 10 x ScanEagle in service)

For the San Marco Marine Brigade, the Navy plans to acquire following assets:
 72 x ACV 1.1 amphibious 8x8 combat vehicles (36 vehicles ordered December 2022)
 90 x VTMM Orso armored 4x4 vehicles

Rank structure

See also
 Italian Armed Forces
 Uniforms of the Italian Armed Forces
 Gruppo Sportivo della Marina Militare
 List of active Italian Navy ships
 List of decommissioned ships of the Italian Navy
 Regia Marina

References

External links

 Marina Militare official site

 
Marina Militare
1946 establishments in Italy